Andor may refer to:

 Andor (TV series), a television series in the Star Wars universe
Cassian Andor, the titular character 
 Andor (Wheel of Time), a country in Robert Jordan's The Wheel of Time novels
 Andor Technology, a manufacturer of scientific digital cameras
 And/or, a grammatical conjunction (and logical disjunction)
 Andor (also known as Andoria), the homeworld of the fictional species Andorian, from Star Trek.
 Númenor (or Andor), a fictional place in J. R. R. Tolkien's writings
 A planet in the television series The Adventures of the Galaxy Rangers
 A major enemy agent in the T.H.U.N.D.E.R. Agents comic

People

Surname
 László Andor (born 1966), Hungarian economist and politician

Given name
 Andor Ajtay (1903–1975), Hungarian actor
 Andor Basch (1885–1944), Hungarian painter
 Andor Deli (born 1977), Hungarian politician 
 Andor Gomme (1930–2008), British scholar of English literature and architectural history
 Andor Jaross (1896–1946), Hungarian politician and Nazi collaborator
 André Kertész (born Kertész Andor; 1894-1985), Hungarian-born American photographer
 Andor Lilienthal (1911–2010), Hungarian chess grandmaster
 Andor Toth (1925–2006), American violinist, conductor, educator
 Andor Toth Jr. (1948–2002), American cellist

See also
 Andorra (disambiguation)
 Andorinha (disambiguation)

Hungarian masculine given names